Socket 370 (also known as the PGA370 socket) is a CPU socket first used by Intel for Pentium III and Celeron processors to first complement and later replace the older Slot 1 CPU interface on personal computers. The "370" refers to the number of pin holes in the socket for CPU pins.

Socket 370 was replaced by Socket 423 in 2000.

Overview

Socket 370 started as a budget oriented platform for 66 MHz FSB PPGA Mendocino Celeron CPUs in late 1998, as the move to on-die L2 cache removed the need for a PCB design as seen on Slot 1. From late 1999 to late 2000 it was Intel's main desktop socket for 100/133 MHz FSB Coppermine Pentium IIIs. In 2001, the Tualatin Pentium III processors brought changes to the infrastructure which required dedicated Tualatin-compatible motherboards; some manufacturers would indicate this with a blue (instead of white) socket. These late sockets were typically compatible with Coppermine processors, but not older Mendocino Celerons. Some motherboards that used Socket 370 support Intel processors in dual CPU configurations (e. g. ABIT BP6). Others allowed the use of a Socket 370 or Slot 1 CPU, although not at the same time. The Via-Cyrix Cyrix III, later renamed the VIA C3, also used Socket 370. Slotkets are available that allows Socket 370 CPUs to be used on Slot 1 based motherboards.

Socket 370 Intel processors mechanical load limits
The weight of a Socket 370 CPU cooler should not exceed 180 grams (6.3 ounces). Heavier coolers may result in damage to the die when the system is improperly handled.

Most Intel Socket 370 processors (Pentium III and Celeron) had mechanical maximum load limits which were designed not be exceeded during heat sink assembly, shipping conditions, or standard use. They came with a warning that load above those limits would crack the processor die and make it unusable. The limits are included in the table below.

Socket 370 Intel processors with integrated heat sink mechanical load limits
All Intel Socket 370 processors with integrated heat sink (Pentium III and Celeron 1.13–1.4 GHz) had mechanical maximum load limits which were designed not be exceeded during heat sink assembly, shipping conditions, or standard use. They came with a warning that load above those limits would crack the processor die and make it unusable. The limits are included in the table below.

See also
 List of Intel microprocessors

References

External links
 Socket 370 (PGA370)

Intel CPU sockets